This is the list of 2. Bundesliga top scorers season by season.

The 2. Bundesliga was established in 1974 in two regional divisions and began play in August 1974 with a game between 1. FC Saarbrücken and Darmstadt 98, with Nikolaus Semlitsch of Saarbrücken scoring the first goal of the new league. Bernd Hoffmann of Karlsruher SC and Volker Graul of Arminia Bielefeld became the first top scorers of the southern and northern divisions. From 1981, with the exception of the 1991–92 season, the league operated as a single division.

Horst Hrubesch holds the record for the highest number of goals in a season, with 41 for Rot-Weiss Essen in the 1977–78 season of the northern division. The record holder for the single-division era is Rudi Völler of 1860 Munich in 1981–82, with 37 goals. The only player to finish top scorer four times was Simon Terodde, doing so with VfL Bochum, VfB Stuttgart, 1. FC Köln and Schalke 04. Emanuel Günther was top scorer three times, all with Karlsruher SC (including one shared scoring title). Siegfried Reich, Angelo Vier and Artur Wichniarek (the last shared once) won two titles, with Reich's achievements particularly notable as they occurred seven years apart. Arminia Bielefeld holds the record for top scorers for clubs, having provided the league's top scorer on six occasions. The most career goals in the league were scored by Terodde, with 172.

Top scorers
The league's top scorers:

References

External links
bundesliga.com 

top scorers
top scorers
Germany 2
Association football player non-biographical articles